Luina hypoleuca, the littleleaf silverback, is a species of the genus Luina and the family Asteraceae.

References

External links

Jepson Manual Treatment
USDA Plants Profile
Photo gallery

Senecioneae
Flora of British Columbia
Flora of the Western United States
Flora without expected TNC conservation status